The Star Spangled Banner is a studio album by Pat Boone, released in 1963 on Dot Records.

Billboard picked the album for its "Spotlight" section. "Leading off with the National Anthem, the program includes a group of memorable patriotic songs and songs of the various Armed Forces — 'Marines Hymn,' 'Anchors Aweigh,' 'The U.S. Air Force,' among them," informs the magazine. "Although this current approach is a far cry from [Pat Boone's] "Tutti Frutti" days, it's the kind of thing which could suddenly catch on," opines the reviewer.

Track listing

References 

1963 albums
Pat Boone albums
Dot Records albums
Albums produced by Randy Wood (record producer)